Rauni may mean:

Rauni (deity), a figure in Finnish mythology
Rauni, Ludhiana, a village in the Ludhiana (malwa) district of Punjab state, India
Rauni Khurd, Roopnagar, a village in the Roopnagar (Puaad) district of Punjab state, India